Phlomis armeniaca is a perennial herb in the genus Phlomis endemic to Turkey and the Transcaucasus.

References

armeniaca
Flora of Turkey
Flora of the Transcaucasus